The 1893–94 Ottawa Hockey Club season was the club's ninth season of play. The Club would play in the Amateur Hockey Association of Canada (AHAC) and the Ontario Hockey Association (OHA) leagues. Ottawa tied for first in the AHAC championship and played Montreal for the Stanley Cup. Ottawa was about to play the OHA semi-final, but in a dispute with the OHA executive, refused to travel to Toronto to play the final, and left the league.

OHA season 

Several days before a scheduled match with Queen's to determine the eastern team in the OHA final, the OHA notified Ottawa that the final would be held in Toronto. The Ottawa Hockey Club demanded that the final be played in Ottawa to make up for the default of the Toronto Granites the previous year. The OHA executive refused to change the plans for Ottawa to play in Toronto and the Ottawa club resigned, leaving Queen's as the eastern team in the final. The OHA executive accepted the resignation on February 25, 1894, in a letter to Secretary Murphy.

This started a rift between the Ottawa and Ontario hockey associations that would last over 70 years. An Ottawa team would not be a member of any OHA league until the Ottawa 67s would join the OHA Junior 'A' in 1967, 73 years later. , teams in the Ottawa area play in the Ottawa District Hockey Association, the successor of the Ottawa City Hockey League, and not affiliated with the Ontario association.

AHAC season 
Ottawa returned to play in the AHAC and tied for first place. What was unusual was that they shared first place with three other clubs. The executive of the AHAC proposed a playoff between all four teams, held in Montreal. Quebec city objected to the fact that no games were in Quebec city. Ottawa received a bye to the final because it had to travel to Montreal to play.

Final standing

Game log

Goaltending averages

Scoring leaders 
These statistics are for AHAC play only.

Roster 
 Albert Morel (goal)
 Reginald Bradley
 Edward C. Grant
 Chauncy Kirby
 Halder Kirby
 Joe McDougal
 Sam McDougall
 Harvey Pulford
 Bert Russel (captain)
 Don C. Waters
 Weldy Young

Source: Coleman, pp. 16–17, Kitchen, p. 341

See also 
 1894 AHAC season

References and notes 
 
 

Ottawa Senators (original) seasons
Ottawa